"Leave a Light On" is a song by British singer-songwriter Tom Walker. It was released to digital retailers on 13 October 2017. The song was co-written by Walker and Steve Mac. The song reached the top 10 in Austria, Wallonia, Germany, Italy and Switzerland, while reaching the top 40 in Australia, Flanders, France, Poland and the Netherlands. The song reached number 7 in the UK and number 34 on the Irish Singles Chart.

An acoustic version of the track, arranged and produced by Cliff Masterson was featured in the Sony Bravia TV advert.

Background 
In an interview with Idolator, Walker revealed that the song was about a friend of his who was struggling with addiction, and explained that he wrote it for his "family and [his] friends to let them know that [they] can talk about it.

Charts

Weekly charts

Year-end charts

Certifications

Release history

References

2017 singles
2017 songs
Tom Walker (singer) songs
Songs written by Steve Mac
Song recordings produced by Steve Mac
Songs written by Tom Walker (singer)